Perissostomus palpalis is a species of beetles in the family Carabidae, the only species in the genus Perissostomus.

References

Licininae
Monotypic Carabidae genera